Erasmus Habermehl, also Erasmus Habermel (ca. 1538 – 15 November 1606 in Prague) was a major watchmaker and maker of astronomics and geodesy instruments of the 16th century, who last worked as a court instrument maker at the court of Emperor Rudolf II. in Prague.

He probably originated in southern Germany and probably reached Prague via Nuremberg, the centre of watchmaking art at the time. A brass box signed "Erasmus Habermel Pragae 1576" is considered his earliest known work. He married a Susanna Solis there in 1593 or 1594. In the same year he was appointed "Kay: Mt: Astronomischer und Geometrischer Instrumentmacher". He received commissions from Tycho Brahe and Francesco Padua di Forli, the personal physician (and at the same time alchimist) of the emperor.

In addition to their outstanding technical precision, his instruments were at the same time artistic, objects of the highest order designed in the style of the Renaissance.  reported 1782 in the Illustrations of Bohemian and Moravian scholars and artists together with short news about their life and work of instruments at the imperial court in Prague: "Of Habermel, a Bohemian mechanicus, are here still present 1) – Tycho Brahe's sextant. 2) – some sundials. 3) Some astrolabes, where the former magnetic declination for which in 1558 four pieces decreases quite exactly 10° to the east -[...]" (141 and 142).

Honours 
Habermehl Rock in Antarctica is named after Erasmus Habermehl.

External links 
 
 Erasmus Habermel. Epact
 Habermehl, Erasmus. UhrenLexikon
 Das Astrolabium von Erasmus Habermel. Deutsches Museum, Munich; accessdate 5 November 2018
 Sonnenuhren von Erasmus Habermel und Markus Purmann. Deutsches Museum, München; accessdate 5 November 2018
 Theodolite. Museo Galileo (englisch)
 Erasmus Habermehl. The Princely Collections

References 

German clockmakers
German scientific instrument makers
1530s births
1606 deaths